Beth McCarthy may refer to:

 Beth McCarthy-Miller, American TV director
Beth McCarthy, singer on The Voice UK (series 3)

See also
Elizabeth McCarthy (disambiguation)